The Walker Tariff was a set of tariff rates adopted by the United States in 1846. Enacted by the Democrats, it made substantial cuts in the high rates of the "Black Tariff" of 1842, enacted by the Whigs. It was based on a report by Secretary of the Treasury Robert J. Walker.

The Walker Tariff reduced tariff rates from 32% to 25%. Coinciding with Britain's repeal of the Corn Laws, it led to an increase in trade and was one of the lowest tariffs in American history.

Adoption
Democrat James Polk was elected President in 1844 over Henry Clay, a Whig who advocated a high tariff.

President Polk declared that reduction of the "Black Tariff" would be the first of the "four great measures" that would define his administration. He directed Walker to work out the details. In 1846, Polk delivered Walker's tariff proposal to Congress. Walker urged its adoption to increase commerce between the US and Britain. He also predicted that a reduction in tariff rates would stimulate trade, including imports. The result, asserted Walker, would be a net increase in customs revenue, despite the reduced rates.

Congress, then controlled by Democrats, acted quickly on Walker's recommendations. Southern Democrats, who had little industry in their states, were especially supportive.

The Walker Tariff produced the nation's first standardized tariff: rather than setting fixed rates for specific items on a case-by-case basis, it established general schedules into which all goods could be classified, subject to defined ad valorem rates. The bill reduced rates across the board on most major import items save luxury goods, such as tobacco and alcoholic beverages.

Impact
The bill made moderate reductions in many tariff rates. As Walker had predicted, trade increased substantially, and net revenue collected also increased,  from $30 million annually under the Black Tariff in 1845 to almost $45 million annually by 1850. It also improved relations with Britain that had soured over the Oregon boundary dispute.

It was passed along with a series of financial reforms proposed by Walker including the Warehousing Act of 1846.  The 1846 tariff rates initiated a fourteen-year period of relative free trade by nineteenth century standards lasting until the high Morrill Tariff of 1861.

The Walker Tariff remained in effect until the Tariff of 1857, which used it as a base and reduced rates further.

The 1861 Morril Tariff raised the effective rate collected on dutiable imports by approximately 70%. Customs revenue from tariffs totaled $345 million from 1861 through 1865.

The tariff act of 1842 had a significant impact on railroad building.  The duty of $17/ton of hammered bar iron and $25/ton of rolled bar iron raised costs by 50 to 80%.  The Walker tariff of 1846 reduced the duty to 30% and set off a railroad building boom in the 1850s.

References

Further reading
Taussig, Frank. Tariff History of the United States (1912)

1846 in the United States
United States federal taxation legislation
United States federal trade legislation
Presidency of James K. Polk